In enzymology, an alkan-1-ol dehydrogenase (acceptor) is an enzyme that catalyzes the chemical reaction

primary alcohol + acceptor  aldehyde + reduced acceptor

Thus, the two substrates of this enzyme are primary alcohol and acceptor, whereas its two products are aldehyde and reduced acceptor.

This enzyme belongs to the family of oxidoreductases, specifically those acting on the CH-OH group of donor with other acceptors.  The systematic name of this enzyme class is alkan-1-ol:acceptor oxidoreductase. Other names in common use include polyethylene glycol dehydrogenase, and alkan-1-ol:(acceptor) oxidoreductase.  This enzyme participates in fatty acid metabolism.  It employs one cofactor, PQQ.

References

 
 

EC 1.1.99
Pyrroloquinoline quinone enzymes
Enzymes of unknown structure